Shaun Edward Alexander (born August 30, 1977) is an American former professional football player who was a running back for the Seattle Seahawks and Washington Redskins of the National Football League (NFL).  He played college football for the Alabama Crimson Tide, and was drafted by the Seattle Seahawks 19th overall in the 2000 NFL Draft. In May 2011, he was inducted into the Alabama Sports Hall of Fame.

Alexander set numerous NFL and Seattle Seahawks' franchise records and was named the NFL MVP in 2005.  He was also named to the NFL's 2000 All-Decade team, and ranks eighth all time in NFL history for rushing touchdowns (100). Alexander was the first athlete featured on the cover of both the NCAA Football and Madden NFL series of video games.

Early career
Alexander was born and raised in Florence, Kentucky. His father, Curtis Alexander Jr., works for Morton Salt and his mother Carol works in the truancy department of the Boone County School District. He has an older brother Durran, and four older half-sisters and three older half-brothers. His parents divorced when he was 11, and he and Durran were raised by their mother in a two-bedroom apartment off of Shenandoah Drive in Florence, Kentucky.

Alexander attended Florence Elementary School and Rector A. Jones Middle School. In 1991, he entered Boone County High School. As a freshman, he played football for the junior varsity team and was voted Class President—as he was every year in high school. As well as football, Alexander excelled in basketball, baseball, and track.

In his sophomore season, Alexander made the varsity team as the second-string running back. By mid-season, he was the team's featured running back as he rushed for 1,095 yards and 14 touchdowns. During his junior season in 1993, Alexander ran for 2,396 yards and 42 touchdowns as Boone County made it to the state semifinals. In a game versus Campbell County, Alexander rushed for seven touchdowns. He was listed in "Faces in the Crowd" section of Sports Illustrated in January 1994.

During his senior season, 1994-1995, Alexander rushed for 3,166 yards and a state record 54 touchdowns and was named Kentucky's "Mr. Football". He also was selected All-American by Parade and USA Today's 1994 All USA team, named "Old Spice Athlete of the Month" by Sports Illustrated, and was known as "Alexander the Great" and had his high school number 37 retired a few weeks before his graduation. In three varsity seasons, Alexander rushed for 6,657 yards and 110 touchdowns—both of which are Top 10 prep all-time records.

College career
Alexander had narrowed his choices down to Michigan, Alabama, and Notre Dame (where his brother Durran played drums in the marching band). He ultimately chose the University of Alabama because of the warm weather and the overall students' enthusiasm.

In 1995, during his senior year in high school, Alexander accepted a scholarship from Gene Stallings, then-head coach for the Alabama Crimson Tide football team. Mike DuBose would replace Stallings in 1997. In his freshman season on campus, Alexander was redshirted.

In 1996, as a redshirt freshman, Alexander rushed for a school-record 291 yards and four touchdowns in a 26–0 victory over rivals LSU at Tiger Stadium. He finished the year with 589 rushing yards and six touchdowns, and helped the team to a 10-3 record.

The 1997 season proved to be tough for both Alexander and the Crimson Tide, as Alexander finished with 415 rushing yards and three touchdowns, while the Tide limped to four victories.

The 1998 season turned out much better for both, as Alabama improved to 7-5, and Alexander had 18 touchdowns (14 rushing and four receiving) and attained 1,178 yards. He was rewarded with an All-Southeast Conference honors at the end of the season.

Following his junior season, Alexander decided to return for his senior season rather than leaving early for the NFL. After initially being given Heisman Trophy consideration to start the season, those hopes would fade as the season progressed and ended with a sprained ankle versus Tennessee. Alexander still played a key role in leading the Tide to the SEC Championship in 1999, as Alabama trampled #3 Florida with a 34-7 victory. In the fourth quarter of the 1999 Iron Bowl versus rivals Auburn, Alexander led a comeback as he scored three rushing touchdowns in the 28–17 victory, finishing the game with 199 total yards. He left the school holding 15 records, including 3,565 career rushing yards.

College statistics

Professional career

Seattle Seahawks

2000–2004
Alexander was drafted by the Seattle Seahawks on April 15 in the 2000 NFL Draft in the first round with the 19th overall pick. The Seahawks acquired the pick in the draft following a trade that sent wide receiver Joey Galloway to the Dallas Cowboys. In his rookie season, Alexander saw limited action behind starter Ricky Watters, rushing for just 313 yards and two touchdowns.

In Alexander's second season in the NFL, he became the Seahawks' featured running back, following injuries and eventual retirement of Watters. Alexander rushed for 1,318 yards and 14 touchdowns, only behind Marshall Faulk for total touchdowns. The offensive line was led by Pro Bowler Walter Jones and rookie Steve Hutchinson. On ESPN Sunday Night Football on November 11, 2001, versus AFC West rival Oakland Raiders at Husky Stadium in Seattle, Alexander rushed for a franchise-record 266  yards on 35 carries, including an 88-yard run to the endzone. He was named the NFC Player of the week after his performance against the Raiders. Following the season, Fox Sports Net hired him to do a variety show called Shaun Alexander Live, aimed to poke fun at Alexander's lack of recognition despite his on-field accomplishments, but it was short-lived.

In 2002, Alexander started all 16 games en route to an NFC leading (and franchise record) 16 rushing touchdowns, four of which came in the first half of Seattle's September 29, 2002 game against the Minnesota Vikings in only the second regular-season game ever at Seahawks Stadium (subsequently renamed Qwest Field, then renamed a 2nd time to CenturyLink Field, and then renamed a 3rd time to Lumen Field) in Seattle. He also caught an 80-yard touchdown pass in the first half. The five touchdowns in that half set an NFL record. This was another ESPN Sunday Night Football game, enhancing Alexander's reputation for performing phenomenally well in high-profile, prime time nationally televised games.

2003 was another productive year for Alexander. He rushed his way to a career-high of 1,435 rushing yards and scored 16 touchdowns. Seattle also made its first playoff appearance since 2000. Alexander's success in the 2003 season earned him his first trip to Honolulu for the annual Pro Bowl.

In 2004, Alexander remained one of the key components of Seattle's offense. He finished second in the NFL in rushing yards (with 1,696) to the New York Jets' Curtis Martin by a single yard. After being passed over for a late-game rushing attempt during his team's victory over the Atlanta Falcons, Alexander accused his coach Mike Holmgren of "stabbing him in the back" by denying him an opportunity to win the rushing title. Alexander retracted his comments the following day and expressed support for his coach.

2005 season
Alexander had a great deal of success in the 2005 season. In the season opener against the Jacksonville Jaguars, he rushed for 73 yards. Other highlights include an 88-yard touchdown run against the Arizona Cardinals on November 6, 2005, and rushing for 165 yards against the St. Louis Rams on November 13, 2005. Also, he had two 4 touchdown games, against Arizona on September 25, 2005, and against the Houston Texans on October 16, 2005. He led the NFL in rushing yards, rushing touchdowns, Pro Bowl votes, and points.

During the 2005 season, Alexander broke the franchise record for the most rushing yards in the Seattle Seahawks' history. On November 13, 2005, scoring 3 touchdowns, Alexander became the first running back in NFL history to record 15 or more touchdowns in five consecutive seasons. On November 20, 2005, in San Francisco, Alexander became the first player in NFL history to score 19 rushing or receiving touchdowns in only 10 games (Steve Van Buren had 18 in 1945). This feat eventually led to him breaking Priest Holmes record of 27 total touchdowns set in 2003, and his 27 rushing touchdowns also tied Holmes for the most in a single season (the record was broken a year later by LaDainian Tomlinson).

On December 11, 2005, in Seattle's NFC West-clinching victory over the San Francisco 49ers, Alexander had his ninth 100–yard rushing game of the year, breaking Chris Warren's franchise record of eight 100–yard games. In the process he also set a more significant NFL record, running for 100 yards against divisional opponents in nine straight games, a record previously held by Walter Payton. On December 18, 2005, in a game against the Tennessee Titans, Alexander passed the 1,600-yard mark for the second consecutive season, had a Seahawks franchise record 10th 100-yard rushing game, and scored his 24th rushing touchdown of the year (as well as the 86th of his career, tying him with Priest Holmes at 12th on the all-time rushing touchdown leader list). Perhaps more substantial is that his 96th career touchdown moved him into an 18th place tie with Randy Moss and Eric Dickerson on the all-time touchdown leader list, having already bumped Priest Holmes (94 TDs) into 21st. Alexander also became the first Seahawks player to appear on the cover of Sports Illustrated.

On January 1, 2006, in a game versus the Green Bay Packers, Alexander set the single-season touchdown record at 28, and tied Priest Holmes's record of 27 rushing touchdowns in a season. Alexander also won his first NFL rushing title with 1,880 rushing yards, while leading the NFC for the second consecutive year. In 2005, he joined Emmitt Smith, Priest Holmes, and Marshall Faulk as the only running backs to record consecutive seasons of 20 or more touchdowns. Combined with quarterback Matt Hasselbeck, Alexander aided the Seahawks in producing the league's top ranked offense, and the team scoring title.

Four days later, on January 5, he was awarded the 2005 NFL MVP Award, becoming the first Seahawk to win the MVP award. He beat out New York Giants running back Tiki Barber and Indianapolis Colts quarterback Peyton Manning who had won the award the previous two years. Alexander garnered 19 out of a possible 50 votes. A day after receiving the MVP award, Alexander was named Associated Press Offensive Player of the Year. He received 34 votes of a panel of 50 NFL sportswriters and broadcasters. He was also named the FedEx Ground NFL Player of the Year. At the ESPY Awards Alexander received two awards, Best Record Breaking Performance and Best NFL Player.

In the Divisional playoff game against the Washington Redskins Alexander suffered a concussion early on and had to watch the Seahawks win. However, in the NFC Championship Game against the Carolina Panthers he had 34 carries for 132 yards and two touchdowns, which was easily the best playoff performance of his career.

The Seahawks lost to the Pittsburgh Steelers in Super Bowl XL on February 5, 2006. Alexander was, however, the leading rusher of the game with 95 yards. At the end of the season, he was selected to be the cover athlete of Madden NFL 2007. Alexander was the first player to be featured on both the covers of Madden NFL and NCAA Football (the latter on 2001). He was also the only one with this accomplishment up until Larry Fitzgerald was selected to appear on Madden NFL 10, though Fitzgerald was sharing a cover with the Steelers' Troy Polamalu.

Alexander's MVP season was celebrated musically by Dustin Blatnik and the 12th Man Band in the song "Sweet Shaun Alexander", a parody of Lynyrd Skynyrd's "Sweet Home Alabama".  "Sweet Shaun" was widely aired in the Seattle area in the weeks leading up to Super Bowl XL, plus national play on ESPN Radio and other outlets.  The song was decried in Sports Illustrated magazine, calling this parody "the sacrilege with cheese".

2006 season
In March 2006, Alexander signed an eight-year, $62 million contract ($15.1 million of which was guaranteed and $15 million to be paid in the first year of the contract) to remain with the Seattle Seahawks organization, becoming the highest paid running back in NFL history at the time. However, the Seahawks All-Pro offensive guard Steve Hutchinson left to go to the Minnesota Vikings several weeks later due to free agency, weakening an offensive line that had been a large part of Alexander's 2005 productivity.

Alexander broke his left foot in Week 3 of the season, effectively continuing the Madden Curse. However, in the same game, Alexander set a team record while scoring his 102nd touchdown of his career, breaking Steve Largent's record. He returned to action on November 19 against the San Francisco 49ers, rushing 17 times for 37 yards. In a November 27 game on ESPN's Monday Night Football against the Packers, Alexander carried the ball a team record 40 times for 201 yards in a game that featured snow for the first time at Qwest Field. Alexander's performance was a return to MVP form and yet another prime-time showcase for Alexander, who was still playing with the broken foot. In a December 10 loss to the Arizona Cardinals, Alexander broke Barry Sanders's record for most consecutive games with a run of 10 or more yards.

Alexander finished the 2006 season with 252 rushing attempts for 896 yards and seven touchdowns in ten games.

2007 season
During Week 1's game against Tampa Bay, Alexander sustained a fractured left wrist. He indicated that the injury was not major and that he would continue to play, but his performance took a noticeable turn for the worse. During Week 5, Alexander's lead blocker, Mack Strong, was injured with a herniated disk in his neck, forcing him to retire; he was replaced by Leonard Weaver. This left Alexander even more exposed and as a result, injuries continued to plague him. In Week 9, he sprained both his knee and ankle. Even so, in the final game of the regular season, Alexander was able to become the eighth player in NFL history to score 100 rushing touchdowns.

Alexander's final regular season statistics for the 2007 season were 716 yards rushing on 207 attempts, a 3.5–yard per carry with four touchdowns in 10 games. He added 14 receptions for 76 yards and a touchdown to his rushing totals. After a January 12, 2008 playoff loss to the Green Bay Packers in which Alexander recorded only 20 yards on 9 carries and scored just one touchdown, the Seahawks opted to cut Alexander from the team on April 22, 2008.

Washington Redskins
After his release, Alexander visited several teams including the Cincinnati Bengals, Detroit Lions, and New Orleans Saints, but was not able to come to terms on a contract until he visited the Washington Redskins. On October 14, 2008, the team signed Alexander to fill the void left when back-up running back Ladell Betts went down with a knee injury. However, the Redskins released Alexander on November 25, 2008 after he logged only 11 carries in four games and averaged 2.2 yards per carry.

NFL career statistics

Regular season

Awards & Accolades 
In 2016, Alexander was inducted into The Kentucky Athletic Hall of Fame

Personal life
Alexander married Valerie Alexander (née Boyd) in April 2002 after a two-year courtship. Together, the couple have 12 children. The couple had another child who died unexpectedly at two months of age. Alexander has an older brother by one year named Durran who serves as executive director of the Shaun Alexander Foundation.

See also
 List of NCAA major college football yearly scoring leaders

References

Further reading
 Alexander, Shaun; The Walk: Clear Direction and Spiritual Power for Your Life (2010). WaterBrook

External links

 
 
 Washington Redskins bio
 

1977 births
Living people
African-American Christians
African-American players of American football
Alabama Crimson Tide football players
American football running backs
American Protestants
National Conference Pro Bowl players
People from Florence, Kentucky
Players of American football from Kentucky
Seattle Seahawks players
University of Alabama alumni
Washington Redskins players
Sportspeople from the Cincinnati metropolitan area
21st-century African-American sportspeople
20th-century African-American sportspeople
National Football League Offensive Player of the Year Award winners
National Football League Most Valuable Player Award winners